Prionognathus is a genus of beetles in the family Carabidae, containing the following species:

 Prionognathus fossor LaFerte-Senectere, 1851
 Prionognathus overlaeti (Burgeon, 1935)

References

Licininae